Gabriella Pregnolato (born 30 May 1971) is an Italian former cyclist. She competed in the women's individual pursuit at the 1992 Summer Olympics.

References

External links
 

1971 births
Living people
Italian female cyclists
Olympic cyclists of Italy
Cyclists at the 1992 Summer Olympics
Place of birth missing (living people)
People from Correggio, Emilia-Romagna
Sportspeople from the Province of Reggio Emilia
Cyclists from Emilia-Romagna